The 2010 Open de Nice Côte d'Azur was a men's tennis tournament play on outdoor clay courts. It was the 26th edition of the Open de Nice Côte d'Azur, and was part of the 250 series of the 2010 ATP World Tour. It took place at the Nice Lawn Tennis Club in Nice, France, from 17 May through 22 May 2010. Unseeded Richard Gasquet won the singles title.

Finals

Singles

 Richard Gasquet defeated  Fernando Verdasco, 6–3, 5–7, 7–6(7–5)

Doubles

 Marcelo Melo /  Bruno Soares defeated  Rohan Bopanna /  Aisam-ul-Haq Qureshi, 1–6, 6–3, [10–5]

Entrants

Seeds

 Seedings are based on the rankings of May 10, 2010.

Other entrants
The following players received wildcards into the main draw:
  Mario Ančić
  Arnaud Clément
  Gianni Mina

The following players received entry from the qualifying draw:
  Steve Darcis
  David Guez
  Adrian Mannarino
  Illya Marchenko

The following player received the lucky loser spot:
  Laurent Recouderc

References

External links
 Official website
 ATP tournament profile